Nathuram Ramchandra Shakyawar (14 November 1925 – 31 July 2005) was an Indian politician and social worker who was a Member of Parliament of 7th Lok Sabha from Jalaun constituency of Uttar Pradesh. While he was a student, Shakyawar took part in the Quit India Movement in 1942 and was sent to jail. He also participated in the "Jail Bharo Andolan" and was imprisoned again. Shakyawar died on 31 July 2005, at the age of 79. Shakyawar belong to Koli caste.

References 

1925 births
Koli people
2005 deaths
People from Jalaun district
People from Uttar Pradesh
Indian National Congress politicians from Uttar Pradesh